The Big State League was a mid-level, Class B level circuit in American minor league baseball that played for 11 seasons, from 1947 through 1957. Its member clubs were exclusively based in Texas. The Corpus Christi Clippers (1955-1956),  Texarkana Bears (1947, 1950) and Wichita Falls Spudders (1949, 1953) each won two league championships.

History
It saw much change in its 11-year lifetime, with no team serving as a member in every single season. Waco came the closest, serving from 1947 to 1956.  The league was known as an offense-oriented circuit.

The league debuted at the height of the short-lived postwar minor league baseball boom, in 1947, with eight clubs, all unaffiliated with Major League Baseball farm systems. Original teams were the: Austin Pioneers, Gainesville Owls, Greenville Majors, Paris Red Peppers, Sherman–Denison Twins, Texarkana Bears, Waco Dons and Wichita Falls Spudders.

Two clubs, Texarkana and Greenville, won more than 100 games in 1947, and four league members exceeded 100,000 in attendance. But beginning in 1953, the Big State League's teams struggled to reach six figures in that category. Only Corpus Christi drew over the 100,000 mark during the league's final five seasons, doing so on two occasions. The league was further weakened when a traditionally strong member, Austin, moved up to the AA Texas League in 1956.

The league began the 1957 campaign with only six clubs:  the Victoria Rosebuds, Corpus Christi Clippers, Beaumont Pirates, Abilene Blue Sox, Port Arthur Redlegs and Wichita Falls Spudders. Its ranks were reduced to four when Wichita Falls disbanded in May, while the Port Arthur team moved to Temple that same month before folding in August. Of the surviving teams, Victoria, a Brooklyn Dodgers farm team, outlasted Corpus Christi, Beaumont and Abilene to win the league's last pennant and playoff championship.

J. Walter Morris served as League President from 1947 through 1950, Howard Green, took over from 1951 through 1955 and Hal Sayles was in charge the final two years, 1956–57.

Cities represented
Abilene, Texas: Abilene Blue Sox 1956–1957, moved from West Texas–New Mexico League 1946–1955
Austin, Texas: Austin Pioneers 1947–1955
Beaumont, Texas: Beaumont Exporters or Beaumont Shippers (depending on source) 1956; Beaumont Pirates 1957
Bryan, Texas: Bryan Majors 1953; Bryan Indians 1954
Corpus Christi, Texas: Corpus Christi Clippers 1954–1957
Del Rio, Texas: Del Rio Indians 1954
Gainesville, Texas: Gainesville Owls 1947–1951
Galveston, Texas: Galveston White Caps 1954–1955, moved from Gulf Coast League 1950–1953
Greenville, Texas: Greenville Majors 1947–1950, moved from East Texas League 1946; Greenville Majors 1953
Harlingen, Texas: Harlingen Capitals 1954–1955, moved from Gulf Coast League 1951–1953 and Rio Grande Valley League 1950
Longview, Texas: Longview Cherokees 1952–1953
Lubbock, Texas: Lubbock Hubbers 1956, moved from West Texas–New Mexico League 1938–1942, 1946–1955
Paris, Texas: Paris Red Peppers 1947, moved from East Texas League 1946; Paris Panthers 1948; Paris Indians 1952–1953
Port Arthur, Texas: Port Arthur Sea Hawks 1955–1956, moved from Evangeline League 1954 and Gulf Coast League 1950–1953; Port Arthur Redlegs 1957
Sherman, Texas and Denison, Texas: Sherman–Denison Twins 1947–1951
Temple, Texas: Temple Eagles 1949–1954; Temple Redlegs 1957
Texarkana, Texas: Texarkana Bears 1947–1953, moved from East Texas League 1946
Texas City, Texas: Texas City Texans 1955; Texas City Exporters 1956
Tyler, Texas: Tyler East Texans 1951–1953; Tyler Tigers 1954–1955
Victoria, Texas: Victoria Eagles 1956; Victoria Rosebuds 1957, moved to Texas League 1958–1961
Waco, Texas: Waco Dons 1947; Waco Pirates 1948–1953, 1954–1956
Wichita Falls, Texas: Wichita Falls Spudders 1947–1953, moved to Longhorn League 1954; Wichita Falls Spudders 1956–1957

Standings & statistics

1947 to 1952
1947 Big State Leagueschedule

 
Season highlights
Playoffs: Texarkana Bears beat the Paris Red Peppers 4 games to 0.; Wichita Falls Spudders over the Greenville Majors 4 games to 2. Finals:Texarkana Bears 4 games to 2 over the Wichita Falls Spudders. Vern Washington  of the Texarkana Bears led all hitters with a .404 batting average. Buck Frierson of the Sherman-Denison Twins led the league in four categories: 188 runs scored, 248 hits, 197 RBI and 58 home runs. Vallie Eaves, Texarkana Bears pitched his team to 25 wins and Nathaniel Love  of the Greenville Majors struck out 192 opposing batters. Jim Walkup of the Paris Red Peppers led the league with a 3.72 ERA.

1948 Season Big State Leagueschedule
 
Season highlightsPlayoffs: Sherman-Denison Twins 4 games Austin Pioneers 1 ; Wichita Falls Spudders 4 games Waco Pirates 0  Finals:Sherman-Denison Twins 4 wins Wichita Falls Spudders 3 wins. Vern Washington of the Texarkana Bears again led the league in hitting, this time with a .384 average. Donald Cena  of the Waco Pirates scored 142 runs to lead that stat. The trio from Wichita Falls Spudders of  Paul Brotherton  with 218 hits, Jack Bradsher, with 152 RBI and Albert McCarty with 32 HR, led those departments. Thomas Finger of the Wichita Falls Spudders had 21 wins to lead all pitchers and Glenn Blackwood who split time with the Greenville Majors and the Wichita Falls Spudders led the league with 176 strikeouts. Rafael Rivas  of the Sherman-Denison Twins had a 2.33 ERA.

1949 Big State Leagueschedule 
 
Season highlights Playoffs:Waco Pirates over the Wichita Falls Spudders 4 games to 2; Texarkana Bears over the Austin Pioneers 4 games to 1.Finals: Waco Pirates 4 games to 1 over the Texarkana Bears.  Frank Saucier of the Wichita Falls Spudders led the league in hitting with an average of .446 and his teammate  Al McCarty  scored 132 runs. Frank Carswell of the Texarkana Bears had the most hits with 229 and also led in RBI with 145. Conklyn Meriwether of the Greenville Majors had 27 HR. 3 pitchers had an even 20 wins: Elwood Moore and George Estock of the Austin Pioneers and Sidney Peterson of Wichita Falls Spudders. William Pierro of the Waco Pirates struck out 275 batters and John Whitehead of the Sherman-Denison Twins led with an 2.73 ERA.

1950 Big State League 
 
Season highlights:Playoffs: Texarkana Bears over Temple Eagles 4 to 2; Greenville Majors over Wichita Falls Spudders 4 to 2.Finals: Texarkana Bears over Greenville Majors 4 to 2. Frank Carswell of the Texarkana Bears was the leading hitter with an even .400 average. His teammate Lou Fitzgerald scored 138 runs and their teammate Milan Vacelich had 144 RBI. The Waco Pirates slugger John Powers busted 39 four baggers.  Junior Bunch had 19 wins for the Temple Eagles. The strikeout leader, Jodie Phipps of the Texarkana Bears struck out 173 batters. Carmen Ferullo of the Wichita Falls Spudders led the league with a 2.89 ERA.

1951 Big State Leagueschedule
 
Season highlights: Playoffs: Gainesville Owls 4 games, Austin Pioneers 2; Sherman-Denison Twins 4 games, Temple Eagles 1. Finals: Gainesville Owls 4 games, Sherman-Denison Twins 1. Les Goldstein of the Temple Eagles led all hitters with a .376 average and his teammate Frederick Bell had 216 hits. Bobby Phillips of the Wichita Falls Spudders scored 128 runs and Dean Stafford of the Sherman-Denison Twins led the league in both RBI, with 151 and home runs with 32. Lee Roy Jones of the Austin Pioneers and George O'Donnell of the Waco Pirates had 22 wins each and Robert Upton of the Gainesville Owls led in strikeouts with 209 and also with an ERA of 2.54.

1952 Big State Leagueschedule
 
Season highlights: Playoffs: Austin Pioneers 4 games, Temple Eagles 1; Tyler East Texans 4 games, Texarkana Bears 2. Finals: Tyler East Texans 4 games, Austin Pioneers 0. Bob Van Enman of the Wichita Falls Spudders led in hitting with a .387 average. His teammate Billy Queen scored 157 runs while Buck Frierson of the Paris Indians had 222 base hits. Roy Sanner of the Texarkana Bears had 165 RBI and Dean Stafford of the Paris Indians /Tyler East Texans busted 47 home runs. John Andre of the Austin Pioneers led the league with 25 wins and Gale Pringle of the Tyler East Texans had 164 strikeouts and a 2.93 ERA.

1953 to 1957 
1953 Big State Leagueschedule
 
Season highlights: Waco moved to Longview, May 22;  Greenville moved to Bryan, June25. Playoffs: Wichita Falls Spudders 4 games, Longview Cherokees 0;Tyler East Texans 4 games, Texarkana Bears 1.Finals: Wichita Falls Spudders 4 games, Tyler East Texans 3. Albert Neil of the Wichita Falls Spudders led five different offensive categories: .356 BA, 185 hits, 126 runs, 137 RBI and 39 home runs. Pat Scantlebury of the Texarkana Bears won 24 games and struck out 177. Jodie Phipps of the Bryan Majors had a 2.19 ERA.

1954 Big State Leagueschedule
 
Season highlights: Bryan moved to Del Rio, July 28.Playoffs: Waco Pirates 4 games, Austin Pioneers 2; Corpus Christi Clippers 4 games, Tyler Tigers 1. Finals: Waco Pirates 4 games, Corpus Christi Clippers 3. Dean Stafford of the Galveston White Caps and the Corpus Christi Clippers led the league in hitting with a .362 average, hits with 212, had 171 RBI to go with 38 home runs. John Wilkinson of the Temple Eagles and Corpus Christi Clippers scored 151 runs. James Vitter of the Corpus Christi Clippers had 23 wins, while Gayle Pringle of the Tyler Tigers struck out 212 with a 2.58 ERA.

1955 Big State Leagueschedule
 
Season highlights: Galveston withdrew June 12; Tyler withdrew July 1. Playoffs:Corpus Christi Clippers 4 games, Harlingen Capitals 1; Waco Pirates 4 games, Texas City Texans 3. Finals: Corpus Christi Clippers 4 games, Waco Pirates 0.  Lynn Vandehey of the Texas City Texans led the league with a batting average of .377 and also led in total hits with 195. The Corpus Christi Clippers trio of Ed Charles with 135 runs scored, Dean Stafford with 159 RBI and Keith Little hit 47 home runs to lead those categories. Rene Vega of the Corpus Christi Clippers had 28 wins and a 2.69 ERA. Don Rowe of the Waco Pirates had 226 strikeouts.

1956 Big State Leagueschedule 
 
Season Highlights: Lubbock transferred to Texas City July 8; Beaumont moved to Texas City July 2, and returned, July 8. Playoffs:Corpus Christi Clippers 4 games, Wichita Falls Spudders 1.; Port Arthur Sea Hawks 4 games, Waco Pirates 3. Finals:Port Arthur Sea Hawks 4 games, Corpus Christi Clippers 3. James Kirby of the Port Arthur Sea Hawks was the league's leading hitter with a .358 average and 190 hits. Joe Christian of the Corpus Christi Clippers scored 119 runs with 142 RBI. Danny Ozark of the Wichita Falls Spudders homered 32 times and tied with Rudolph Mayling of the Abilene Blue Sox in the home run category. Leverette Spencer of the Port Arthur Sea Hawks had 21 pitching victories and a league best 2.37 ERA. Ramon Salgado with the Waco Pirates and Herman Greene of the Corpus Christi Clippers also had 21 pitching wins. Evans Killeen of the Abilene Blue Sox had 236 Strikeouts to lead the league.

1957 Big State Leagueschedule
 
Season Highlights: Playoffs: In a shortened format, the Victoria Rosebuds beat the Corpus Christi Clippers 4 games to 1. Wichita Falls withdrew May 23. Port Arthur (20-15) moved to Temple May 30. Temple withdrew August 20. Tony Washington  of the Beaumont Pirates led the last year of the league in hitting with a .356 average. He also led with 179 hits. Nate Peeples of the Corpus Christi Clippers scored 116 runs and had 99 RBI to lead those categories. Don Miles of the Victoria Rosebuds hit 28 home runs. In the pitching finalie, Chris Niclosi of the Victoria Rosebuds had 21 wins and 208 strikeouts and Dave Wickersham of the Beaumont Pirates had a 1.95 ERA to lead the league.

References
Johnson, Lloyd, and Wolff, Miles, editors: The Encyclopedia of Minor League Baseball. Durham, North Carolina: Baseball America, 1997.

External links
 Baseball Reference

Defunct professional sports leagues in the United States
Defunct minor baseball leagues in the United States
Baseball leagues in Texas
1947 establishments in Texas
1957 disestablishments in Texas
Sports leagues established in 1947